Colin Patrick "Col" McPhillips (born 18 April 1975, Santa Monica, California) is an American professional longboard surfrider and three times ASP Longboard World Champion.

Early years
Colin was raised in San Clemente, California, United States, where his parents taught him how to surf at the age of five. He started out as a shortboarder, finishing fourth place in the 1992 United States Surfing Championship in Huntington Beach, California. As a longboarder, he was more successful, Duke Boyd mentioned in his book Legends of Surfing that his shortboard style ripping methods and dynamic power moves proved successful in longboard competitions. He soon won the NSSA National longboard Championship for San Clemente High School in 1992 & 1993. His brother Iain won the NSSA Explorer Men’s event in 1996.

Pro career
Colin won his first professional title winning the US Open of Longboarding in 1994. In October 1999, he defeated Marcelo Freitas from Brazil at One Mile Point, Australia to win his first ASP World Tour title. In 2000 he finished 3rd, but came back to win 2 world titles in a row by defeating local surfer Jason Ribbink in the final at J-Bay, South Africa in 2001 and in August 2002, he narrowly defeated Hawaiian Bonga Perkins to retain the world title at Cabo San Lucas, Mexico. In the same year he took the U.S. Pro Longboard Tour(2002,2004,2005). In 2007, he reclaimed the US Open of Longboarding title by defeating Taylor Jensen in the final. In 2009, he was nominated "O.C. Surfers of the Year".

Other Projects
Colin started out designing longboards for Stewarts. He currently designs longboards and paddle boards for Hobie and features in surf documentaries (see below for details).

Results
 see Longboard Event Champions

Documentaries
McPhillips featured in the following as himself:
Tanked (2014) Hang Ten Barbeque air on Animal Planet
Firsthand (TV series) (2003)Season 3 Episode 11  aired on Fuel TV
Log:Redefine the Stereotype(2006)
From This Day Forward(2005)
Longboard Habit
Fin (2005)
Longboard Fever
Wordz
Unsalted: A Great Lakes Experience (2005)
Costa Rica: Land of Waves (2001) (V)
The Daily Habit: Colin McPhillips (#1.103)" (2006) TV Episode aired on Fuel TV

References

External links

Fuel TV Firsthand
Stewart Surfboards
go211

World Surf League surfers
American surfers
1975 births
Living people